The Bloomsbury Socialist Society (BSS) was a socialist organisation which broke away from the Socialist League in 1888. At the third annual conference of the Socialist League held on 20 May 1888, the Anarchist wing of the league prevailed over the Marxist wing in their rejection of parliamentarianism. The BSS was founded in August 1888 by leading Marxists such as Edward Aveling, Eleanor Marx and A. K. Donald In 1893 they participated in the founding of the Independent Labour Party (ILP), with Aveling being elected the first National Administrative Council. They had joined the ILP with the goal of shifting its ideology towards Marxism, but were unsuccessful, as the party remained under the influence of Keir Hardie's Christian socialism. By 1897, Marx and Aveling left the ILP to rejoin the Social Democratic Federation, while Donald retired from political activity entirely.

References

Socialism in the United Kingdom
Political history of the United Kingdom
1888 establishments in the United Kingdom